Barry Van Heekeren (1932-2004) was an Australian rugby league footballer who played in the 1950s.

Playing career
An Eastern Suburbs junior and lower grade player in the early 1950s, Barry Van Heekeren joined St. George third grade in 1955 and was used 5 times during the 1955 season in first grade. He later returned to Easts as an administrator, and after 30 years as Operations Manager at the Roosters, he was awarded Life Membership in 2002.

Coaching career
Known by the nickname 'Mocca', Barry Van Heekeren was also the coach of the Papua New Guinea national rugby league team in 1968 and 1973.

Death
Barry Van Heekeren died on 25 January 2004.

References

St. George Dragons players
Australian rugby league administrators
Australian rugby league coaches
Papua New Guinea national rugby league team coaches
1932 births
2004 deaths
Australian rugby league players
Rugby league players from Sydney
Rugby league hookers